Max von Schenckendorff (24 February 1875 – 6 July 1943) was a general in the Wehrmacht of Nazi Germany during World War II. He was the commander of Army Group Rear Area behind Army Group Centre from March 1941 until his death. He is best known for organising the Mogilev conference, in which Wehrmacht and SS officers discussed "bandit fighting" tactics, meaning the mass murder of Jews and other real or perceived enemies. The conference resulted in an intensification of the genocide that was already taking place in Army Group Centre Rear Area.

Security operations in occupied Soviet Union

The Wehrmacht's aggressive rear security doctrine, and the use of the "security threat" to disguise genocidal policies, resulted in close cooperation between the army and the security apparatus behind the front lines during Operation Barbarossa, the 1941 German invasion of the Soviet Union. Schenckendorff organised a three-day field conference in Mogilev to create an "exchange of experiences" for the Wehrmacht rear unit commanders. Participating officers were selected on the basis of their "achievements and experiences" in security operations already undertaken; participants included representatives of the Army High Command and Army Group Centre.

The conference began on 24 September and focused on "combating partisans" (Bekämpfung von Partisanen) and reflected Schenckendorff's views on the need for total eradication of the resistance to German occupation as the only way to secure territory behind the armies. Talks presented included: the evaluation of Soviet "bandit" organisations and tactics, why it was necessary to kill political commissars immediately upon capture, and gaining intelligence from local collaborators. The speakers included: Arthur Nebe, commander of Einsatzgruppe B; Higher SS and Police Leader Erich von dem Bach-Zelewski; Max Montua, commander of Police Regiment Center; Hermann Fegelein, commander of the SS Cavalry Brigade; and Gustav Lombard, commander of the 1st SS Cavalry Regiment. Nebe's talk focused on the role of the SD in the common fight against "partisans" and "plunderers". He also covered the "Jewish question", with particular consideration to the anti-partisan movement.

The conference included three field exercises. On the second day, participants travelled to the settlement of Knyazhichi (German: Knjaschitschi). According to the after-action report, "suspicious strangers" (Ortsfremde), that is "partisans", could not be found but the screening of the population revealed fifty-one Jewish civilians, of whom thirty-two were shot. A 16-page executive summary of the conference was distributed to the Wehrmacht troops and police units in the rear area. The conference, while ostensibly an "anti-partisan training", resulted in a dramatic increase in atrocities against Jews and other civilians in the last three months of 1941.

Schenckendorff died on 6 July 1943 during a vacation in Karpacz in the Giant Mountains of a heart attack.

References

Citations

Bibliography
 
 

1875 births
1943 deaths
German Army generals of World War II
Generals of Infantry (Wehrmacht)
Reichswehr personnel
People from Prenzlau
Military personnel from Brandenburg
Recipients of the Gold German Cross
Recipients of the Iron Cross (1914), 1st class
Holocaust perpetrators in Ukraine